Örnäset is a residential area in Luleå, Sweden. It had 3,033 inhabitants in 2010.

References

External links
Örnäset at Luleå Municipality

Luleå